Noble Resolve is a United States Joint Forces Command (USJFCOM) experimentation campaign plan to enhance homeland defense and improve military support to civil authorities in advance of and following natural and man-made disasters.

The Noble Resolve campaign will:

 Develop solutions for U.S. agencies and organizations by providing the means to deter,
prevent, and defeat threats and aggression aimed at the U.S., its territories, and interests.

 Develop solutions to provide improved defense support to civil authorities.
 Build upon global partnerships.

The U.S. Army and USJFCOM wargame Unified Quest 2006 determined the need for homeland defense experimentation.

In 2006, U.S. Joint Forces Command explored the Department of Homeland Security’s scenario for an unaccounted for, "loose," 10 kiloton nuclear weapon. A number of research questions for further experimentation and resolution were identified.

 To what extent does the U.S. have a layered defense?
 When will the U.S. know a threat is headed towards the U.S.?
 What can be done in advance to keep the threat from reaching us from overseas?
 How can USJFCOM provide emergency managers with modeling and simulation support?
 How can the U.S. establish a reliable collaborative environment that includes first responders?
 Is there a tool set that encompasses shared operations, shared information, shared situational awareness, and shared Common Operational Picture?

To answer these questions, USJFCOM established an evolving Noble Resolve experiment campaign plan which started execution in April 2007 and continue over the next couple of years. This campaign is conducted by using discussions, computer-aided modeling and simulation and seminars.

Participants include:
 United States Northern Command
 United States European Command
 United States Strategic Command
 United States Pacific Command
 United States Transportation Command
 United States Army
 United States Navy
 United States Coast Guard
 Department of Homeland Security
 Federal Bureau of Investigation
 Department of Energy
 Federal Emergency Management Agency
 State of Oregon
 Oregon National Guard
 National Guard Bureau
 Commonwealth of Virginia
 Virginia National Guard
 Port of Norfolk, Virginia and Hampton Roads
 Defense Threat Reduction Agency
 Virginia Modeling and Simulation Center
 Virginia Polytechnic Institute and State University
 University of Virginia
 A.P. Moller-Maersk Group
 * Multinational: Austria, Canada, Israel, Japan, Republic of Korea, Poland, Singapore, and Sweden

References

External links
 U.S. Joint Forces Command public Web site
 http://www.crusade-media.com

Non-combat military operations involving the United States